The Podgorica Airbase (also known as Golubovci Airbase) is an active airbase in Montenegro. The airbase facilities are shared with Montenegro's main international airport, Podgorica Airport. It is the main base of the air arm of the Military of Montenegro. During the Yugoslav era, it was the home to the 172nd Aviation Brigade of Yugoslav Air Force and its main flying training base for primary and basic pilot training.

Overview
Podgorica Airbase shares the main runway with nearby Podgorica Airport, and has a large ramp attached to the taxiway, used exclusively for military aircraft.

Part of the military complex was also 08/26 runway, which was not used by civilian planes. It is connected to the main 18/36 runway by 3 km long taxiway, and is located adjacent to Šipčanik Hill, near the town of Tuzi. The hill doubled as an underground aircraft shelter.

Airbase facilities were frequent target of 1999 NATO bombing. Fuel tanks and the aircraft ramps were extensively targeted, as well as parked aircraft. All of the Leteće zvezde aerobatic team G-4 Super Galebs were destroyed on the airbase premises during the strikes. Šipčanik underground shelter was also targeted on several occasions, and was since unused as an aircraft shelter. It has been converted into a wine cave by the Plantaže company. The entire Šipčanik compound, tightly guarded by the JNA during the Yugoslav era, is now of civilian use, and even first 800m of 08/26 runway adjacent to the Šipčanik hill is accessible by car.

With Montenegro's independence on 3 June 2006, the newly formed Military of Montenegro announced that it will not maintain a combat air force. Currently, 11 G-4 Super Galebs (4 operational), 4 Lola Utva 75s, 11 Aérospatiale Gazelles and 1 Mil Mi-8 are located at Podgorica Airbase. The helicopters were incorporated in the newly formed air arm of the Military of Montenegro, while the fate of the jets and trainers is yet to be decided. The Podgorica Airbase is designated to become a regional helicopter pilots training facility.

See also
Entrance in Šipčanik underground aircraft shelter
Podgorica Airport
Military of Montenegro

References 
  – IATA and ICAO codes
  – IATA, ICAO and DAFIF codes

References

Military of Montenegro
Airports in Montenegro
Yugoslav Air Force bases
Podgorica Municipality